A pieve is an Italian and Corsican term signifying a medieval ecclesiastical/administrative territory and, by extension, the mother church of the territory. It has thus become a common component of place names and of the names of churches.

Churches in Italy
  Pieve di Sant'Andrea (Buggiano) in Buggiano, Province of Pistioa, Tuscany
  Pieve di Sant'Andrea (Pistoia), in Pistoia, Province of Pistioa, Tuscany

Places in Italy 
 Città della Pieve, a commune in the Province of Perugia, Umbria
 Pieve a Nievole, a commune in the Province of Pistoia, Tuscany
 Pieve Albignola, a commune in the Province of Pavia, Lombardy
 Pieve d'Alpago, a commune in the Province of Belluno, Veneto
 Pieve del Cairo, a commune in the Province of Pavia, Lombardy
 Pieve di Bono, a commune in the Province of Trento, Trentino-Alto Adige/Südtirol
 Pieve di Cadore, a commune in the Province of Belluno, Veneto
 Pieve di Cento, a commune in the Province of Bologna, Emilia-Romagna
 Pieve di Coriano, a commune in the Province of Mantua, Lombardy
 Pieve di Ledro, a former commune in the Province of Trento, Trentino-Alto Adige/Südtirol
 Pieve di Livinallongo, seat of the commune of Livinallongo del Col di Lana in the Province of Belluno, Veneto
 Pieve di Soligo, a commune in the Province of Treviso, Veneto
 Pieve di Teco, a commune in the Province of Imperia, Liguria
 Pieve d'Olmi, a commune in the Province of Cremona, Lombardy
 Pieve Emanuele, a commune in the Province of Milan, Lombardy
 Pieve Fissiraga, a commune in the Province of Lodi, Lombardy
 Pieve Fosciana, a commune in the Province of Lucca, Tuscany
 Pieve Ligure, a commune in the Province of Genoa, Liguria
 Pieve Porto Morone, a commune in the Province of Pavia, Lombardy
 Pieve San Giacomo, a commune in the Province of Cremona, Lombardy
 Pieve Santo Stefano, a commune in the Province of Arezzo, Tuscany
 Pieve Tesino, a commune in the Province of Trento, Trentino-Alto Adige/Südtirol
 Pieve Torina, a commune in the Province of Macerata, Marche
 Pieve Vergonte, a commune in the Province of Verbano Cusio Ossola, Piedmont

See also 
 Piève, a commune in the Haute-Corse department of Corsica

Church architecture
Architecture in Italy
Catholic Church in Italy